James West FRS (2 May 1703 – 2 July 1772) was a British politician and antiquary, who served as President of the Royal Society between 1768 and 1772.

Life and career
He was the only son of Richard West of Priors Marston, Warwickshire and St. Swithin's, London and educated at Balliol College, Oxford (1719). He then entered the Inner Temple to study law and was called to the bar in 1728 and made a bencher in 1761.

He was elected a fellow of the Royal Society in 1727, and acted as the society's treasurer from 1736 to 1768. He served as President of the Royal Society from 1768 until his death in 1772.

He was elected as MP for St Albans at the 1741 general election which he represented until 1768.  The historian Lewis Namier claims that in two volumes of correspondence relating to West's management of the constituency only three items are about matters of public interest, the rest mostly being requests for jobs and other favours.

In 1746 he had purchased a new house at Lincoln's Inn Fields and employed Thomas Carter the Elder to produce two ornate marble chimney-pieces for the house.

In 1768 he became the member for Boroughbridge, Yorkshire which he served until 1772. West served twice as junior Secretary to the Treasury and twice as senior Secretary to the Treasury.

Family

He married Sarah, the daughter of Sir Thomas Steavens, a wealthy timber merchant of Eltham, Kent. They lived in the Piazza in Covent Garden and bought Alscot Park, then in Gloucestershire but now in Warwickshire, as a country retreat to which he could retire. He replaced the old house with the present one built in a Rococo Gothic style and moved in c.1762.

James West the younger, the only son of West and Sarah Steavens, died in 1795, predeceasing his mother. Alscot Park thereby passed to James West the younger's son, James Robert West (died 1838).

See also
 List of presidents of the Royal Society

References

1703 births
1772 deaths
Alumni of Balliol College, Oxford
Fellows of the Royal Society
Members of the Inner Temple
Presidents of the Royal Society
Members of the Parliament of Great Britain for English constituencies
British MPs 1741–1747
British MPs 1747–1754
British MPs 1754–1761
British MPs 1761–1768
British MPs 1768–1774